Brady Township is the name of some places in the U.S. state of Michigan:

 Brady Township, Kalamazoo County, Michigan
 Brady Township, Saginaw County, Michigan

See also 
 Brady Township (disambiguation)

Michigan township disambiguation pages